Christopher King (born 2 June 1956) is an Australian actor and entertainer.

After a brief appearance in soap opera Number 96, King became best known for his six-year stint as orderly (later nurse) Dennis Jamison in Channel Nine's long-running soap opera The Young Doctors (1976–1982).

Talent management 
He subsequently set up and now runs his own talent school. Natalie Imbruglia is one of its former pupils.

References

External links
 

1956 births
Living people
Australian male television actors
Male actors from Hobart